NAFA may refer to:

Organizations
Nanyang Academy of Fine Arts, Singapore
National Association of Fleet Administrators, Canada and U.S.
Nauru Australian Football Association
New Alliance of Faso, a political party in Burkina Faso
Nigerian American Football Association, Nigeria
North American Falconers Association
North American Fur Auctions, Canada
North American Flyball Association

Other
Nuevo Acceso Ferroviario a Andalucía (New Rail Link to Andalusia), a high-speed rail link in Spain

See also
Nafa (disambiguation)